Vít Kremlička (born 22 October 1962) is a Czech poet and writer.

Life 

Vít Kremlička is Czech poet and writer, laureate of Jiří Orten Prize (1991).

Work 

Lodní deník, Nezávislé tiskové středisko, 1991 — Jiří Orten Award
Cizrna, Torst, 1995
Starý zpěvy, Revolver Revue, 1997
Zemský povídky, Hynek, 1999
Prozatím, Petrov, 2001
Amazonia, Klokočí a Knihovna Jana Drdy, 2003
Manael, Protis, 2005
Země Noc, básnická sbírka, Clinamen 2006
Tajná cikánská kronika, Pavel Mervart (Edice současné české poezie) 2007

References

External links 
Interview with Vít Kremlička 
Poet Vít Kremlička - Interview
 National Library ČR - Vít Kremlička's list of books

1962 births
Living people
Czech artists
Czech poets
Czech male poets